Let Them Have Their Fun is the fourth full-length release by Canadian rock band Alert the Medic. The album was produced and mixed by Mike Turner (musician), engineered by Phil Hotz with additional engineering by Turner. Let Them Have Their Fun was recorded in Toronto, Ontario, Canada at Revolution Recording with additional tracking done at The Pocket Studios in February 2017 and was mastered by Harry Hess at H-Bomb Mastering in Toronto. It was released through Fontana North and Cadence Music Group on September 8, 2017.

The lead-off single Corporate Kid peaked at #17 on the Canadian Active Rock charts

Track listing
 "What Are The Odds?" - 4:25
 "Our Finest Hour" - 3:23
 "Allan Park" - 3:53
 "Farewell, For Now" - 3:49
 "Corporate Kid" - 4:00
 "Young Love" - 3:29
 "Lonely" - 3:33
 "Music In The Background" - 3:25
 "Heart Of Hearts" - 3:18
 "NorCal" - 4:52

Personnel
 Ryan MacDonald - Vocals, guitar, keyboard
 Matt Campbell - Bass guitar
 Dale Wilson - Drums, percussion
 Troy Arseneault - Guitar

Additional Musicians
 Kyle Varley - Organ, Piano
 Gene Hardy - Tenor and Baritone Sax on "What Are The Odds?"
 William Sperandei - Trumpet on "What Are The Odds?"

Art
 Alert The Medic - Artwork and Concept

Production
 Produced and Engineered by Mike Turner
 Revolution sessions Engineered by Phil Hotz
 Revolution Assistant Engineer: Andrew Doidge
 Mixed by Mike Turner and Alert The Medic
 Mastered by Harry Hess at HBomb Mastering
 Horns on "What Are The Odds?" recorded at Exeter Sound Studios by Thomas McKay

References

2017 albums
Alert the Medic albums